Persatuan Sepakbola Indonesia Jambi (simply known as Persijam Jambi or Persijam)  is an Indonesian football club based in Jambi City, the capital of Jambi Province. They are currently compete in Liga 3.

Honours
 Liga 3 Jambi
 Champions (1): 2017

References

External links

Jambi
Football clubs in Indonesia
Football clubs in Jambi
Association football clubs established in 1954
1954 establishments in Indonesia